The 2009 Skate Canada International was the final event of six in the 2009–10 ISU Grand Prix of Figure Skating, a senior-level international invitational competition series. It was held at the Kitchener Memorial Auditorium Complex in Kitchener, Ontario on November 19–22. Medals were awarded in the disciplines of men's singles, ladies' singles, pair skating, and ice dancing. Skaters earned points toward qualifying for the 2009–10 Grand Prix Final. The compulsory dance was the Tango Romantica.

Schedule
All times are Eastern Standard Time (UTC-5).

 Friday, November 20
 11:50 - Pairs: Short program
 13:20 - Ladies: Short program
 18:30 - Ice dancing: Compulsory dance
 19:55 - Men: Short program
 Saturday, November 21
 12:00 - Ice dancing: Original dance
 13:30 - Pairs: Free skating
 16:00 - Men: Free skating
 19:00 - Ladies: Free skating
 Sunday, November 22
 12:15 - Ice dancing: Free dance

Results

Men

Ladies

Pairs
Aliona Savchenko / Robin Szolkowy set a new world record of 206.71 points under the ISU Judging System for pairs combined total score.

Ice dancing

References

External links
 2009 Skate Canada International
 
 
 

Skate Canada International, 2009
Skate Canada International
Skate Canada International
2009 in Canadian sports
2009 in Ontario